Protein replacement therapy is a medical treatment that supplements or replaces a protein in patients in whom that particular protein is deficient or absent. There have been significant advances in this treatment. PRT is being tested in clinical trials with the diseases Progeria and Epidermolysis bullosa dystrophica as a potential treatment. For patients with Epidermolysis bullosa dystrophica there has been promising results.

See also 
 Enzyme replacement therapy
Gene therapy

References

Further reading 
 

Medical treatments